Cortland Temujin Finnegan (born February 2, 1984) is a former American football cornerback. He played college football at Samford, and was drafted by the Tennessee Titans in the seventh round of the 2006 NFL Draft. Finnegan also played for the St. Louis Rams, Miami Dolphins, Carolina Panthers and New Orleans Saints. He was a Pro Bowler in 2008.

High school career
Finnegan attended Milton High School in Milton, Florida, where he starred as safety and tailback, earning second-team All-State as a senior in 2002. He caught 22 passes for 403 yards, and also averaged 3.4 yards per rush and scored 3 touchdowns rushing. On defense, he recorded 65 tackles.

College career
During his sophomore year, Finnegan was named first-team All-OVC, third-team All-OVC as returner, third-team All-American by Sports Network and earned Ohio Valley Conference Defensive Player of the Year honors, while starting every game. Finnegan totaled team and career-high 108 tackles, three tackles for loss, career-high three interceptions, eight passes defensed and two fumble recoveries, and he also returned 21 kickoffs for 577 yards (27.5 avg.) and one touchdown.

As a junior, Finnegan was named first-team All-OVC, while starting every game at free safety.  He led his team with 86 tackles, two tackles for loss, three interceptions (tied career-high), two passes defensed and one fumble forced. Finnegan also returned 11 kickoffs for 286 yards (26.0 avg.).

During his senior year at Samford, Finnegan was named first-team All-American by NFL Draft Report, first-team All-American by American Football Coaches Association and first-team All-OVC for third consecutive year. He started every game at free safety and led team with 98 tackles for third consecutive season and added two tackles for loss, one interception, seven passes defensed, one fumble forced and one fumble recovery. Cortland Finnegan ranked first in OVC conference with 15.1 punt return average, while returning 14 punts for 212 yards and one touchdown.  Ranked second in OVC conference with 25.1 kickoff return average on 15 returns for 376 yards.

Professional career

2006 NFL Draft
Playing at FCS school Samford, Finnegan was very much unnoticed and overlooked in the 2006 NFL Draft. He displayed good speed at Samford's Pro Day, but lacked ideal height and was deemed a shaky tackler. Sports Illustrated projected him to go undrafted, but Finnegan was selected by the Tennessee Titans with the seventh pick of the seventh round (215th overall). He was the first Samford player drafted since Gary Fleming went 163rd overall to the Baltimore Colts in the 1969 NFL Draft.

Tennessee Titans
Finnegan played in all 16 games with two starts (one October 15 at Washington as nickel back and again on November 19 at Philadelphia as left cornerback). Finnegan had 57 tackles, two sacks, three quarterback pressures, one tackle for a loss, seven passes defensed, one forced fumble, and he returned a fumble from David Garrard for a ninety-two-yard touchdown during the December 17 game against Jacksonville. He also tied for fourth on the team with 15 special teams tackles with one fumble recovery.

Finnegan was named the AFC Defensive Player of the Week for the first time for intercepting two David Garrard passes during his Week 1 performance of the 2008 season.

Finnegan was a pleasant surprise for Tennessee in the 2006–07 season after starting at the beginning of the Titans' six-game win streak. He made plays left and right; most notably his 92-yard fumble return against the Jacksonville Jaguars on Sunday, December 17. It was one of the three defensive touchdowns for the Titans in that game—a franchise record. In his NFL debut against the Jets he had a sack and forced fumble.

On December 16, 2008, the National Football League named Finnegan a 2009 Pro Bowl starter alongside Oakland Raiders corner Nnamdi Asomugha. It was Finnegan's first and only Pro Bowl selection.

In 2010, Finnegan became a member of School of the Legends (SOTL), an online community and partner of the NFLPA. SOTL's headquarters are located in Nashville, Tennessee.  He also became Titans' Community Man of the Year due to his fundraising efforts and the establishment of ARK 31, a non-profit charity for children with disabilities and special needs.

On-field incidents
In September 2010, Finnegan was fined $5,000 for throwing New York Giants wide receiver Steve Smith to the ground by his helmet. In October 2010, Finnegan was fined $10,000 for unnecessary roughness after hitting Denver Broncos guard Chris Kuper after Kuper's helmet was off. After this incident, the NFL warned Finnegan that similar infractions in the future would lead to increased discipline. On November 28, 2010, Finnegan was involved in a fist fight with Houston Texans wide receiver Andre Johnson. Finnegan and Johnson were ejected, and each subsequently fined $25,000.

St. Louis Rams
Finnegan signed a five-year, $50 million ($27 million guaranteed) deal with the St. Louis Rams on March 13, 2012. Following his former coach, Jeff Fisher, from the Titans to the Rams.

In Week 1, in his first game with the St. Louis Rams, against the Detroit Lions, Finnegan intercepted a Matthew Stafford pass and returned it for a touchdown.

In Week 2, against the Washington Redskins, Finnegan was able to draw a penalty against Redskins receiver Josh Morgan in the closing seconds. The 15-yard penalty turned what would've been a game tying 47-yard field goal attempt into a 62-yard attempt. The attempt was no good and St. Louis recorded its first victory of the year.

On October 26, Finnegan was fined $7,875 for grabbing Green Bay Packers receiver Jordy Nelson's facemask in Week 7.

On March 5, 2014, it was announced Finnegan would be released from the St. Louis Rams at the beginning of the new league year.

Miami Dolphins and initial retirement
On March 14, 2014, Finnegan signed with the Miami Dolphins. After totaling 44 tackles but no interceptions, he was released by the team on March 2, 2015.

On March 11, 2015, Finnegan announced his retirement from the NFL.

Carolina Panthers

Finnegan came out of retirement after less than a year, signing a one-year deal with the Carolina Panthers on November 30, 2015. In five games Finnegan played in the regular season, he recorded 18 tackles. The Panthers defeated the Seahawks and Cardinals to reach Super Bowl 50, marking Finnegan's first championship appearance. In the Super Bowl, Finnegan recorded four tackles. However, the Panthers fell to the Denver Broncos by a score of 24–10.

New Orleans Saints
Finnegan signed with the New Orleans Saints on August 12, 2016, but was released by the team on September 6.

Personal life
Finnegan is the youngest son of Linda Finnegan. He has an older sister Lela, but their older sister Felicia died when she was 8 years old from congenital Down syndrome, about a decade before Cortland was born.

He is married and has a daughter, who is named after both Finnegan's sister and a girl he befriended while she was battling synovial sarcoma.

References

External links
 Miami Dolphins bio
 St. Louis Rams bio
 Tennessee Titans bio
 Carolina Panthers bio

1984 births
Living people
African-American players of American football
American Conference Pro Bowl players
American football cornerbacks
Carolina Panthers players
Miami Dolphins players
New Orleans Saints players
People from Milton, Florida
Players of American football from Florida
Samford Bulldogs football players
Sportspeople from Fayetteville, North Carolina
St. Louis Rams players
Tennessee Titans players
21st-century African-American sportspeople
20th-century African-American people